is located in Yatomi, Aichi, Japan, and runs under National Association of Racing. It is a 1100-meter dirt oval with 193.5m stretch. It is also commonly known as Donko Racecourse, after the surrounding district.
In 2017 it was announced that the Nagoya Racecourse would move from its original location in Nagoya and move to a new location in Yatomi. In March 11, 2022, the old Nagoya Racecourse held its last race before moving to Yatomi. On March 22, 2002, the new racecourse was formally opened, with races being officially held starting from April 8.

Notable races 
The only stakes races run at Nagoya Racecourse are listed races.

In addition, the JBC Sprint and JBC Classic was held at the old racecourse in 2005 and 2009.

See also 
 National Association of Racing

Links
 official website
 
 

Sports venues in Nagoya
Horse racing venues in Japan

References